The Battle of Acosta Ñu or Campo Grande was a battle during the Paraguayan War, fought on 16 August 1869, between the Triple Alliance and Paraguay. The 3,500 poorly armed Paraguayans, mostly boys between nine and 15 years old, old men and wounded combatants, confronted 20,000 Brazilian and Argentine veteran soldiers.

Background 
In the middle of 1869, the Paraguayan Army was on full retreat and Asunción was under allied occupation. Francisco Solano López, the Paraguayan president, refused to surrender and retreated to the hills, vowing to keep fighting to the end. The commander of the allied forces, Luís Alves de Lima e Silva, the Duke of Caxias, suggested that the war was militarily over. Pedro II, the Brazilian emperor, refused to stop the campaign until López surrendered. Caxias then resigned and was replaced by the Emperor's son-in-law, prince Gaston of Orleans, the Count of Eu.

The Count of Eu and the main Allied troops advanced and took Caacupé on August 15, though López had already moved to Caraguatay. In an attempt to block the Paraguayan Army from retreating to Caraguatay, the Count of Eu sent the 2nd Corps via Barrero Grande, while the 1st Corps pursued López.

Battle 
The Allied troops met the rearguard of the Paraguayan forces at Acosta Ñu on August 16. The battle started at 0800. The initial charge was led by the Allied 1st Corps infantry, supported by artillery. As the Paraguayans retreated across the Yagari River, the 4th Cavalry Brigade made a right flanking movement. Meanwhile, the 2nd Corps reached the Paraguayan rear, which left them no means to retreat. Children were said to cling to the legs of Brazilian soldiers amidst the raging battle, pleading for mercy, only to be decapitated without hesitation. Once all flanks collapsed, the wounded children tried to flee the battlefield alongside their relatives. Yet the Brazilian commander ordered his cavalry to cut the retreat and set the battlefield ablaze, including the field hospital. Large numbers of children died because of these actions.

Legacy 
The battle of Acosta Ñu is depicted in the famous painting Batalha de Campo Grande by Pedro Américo, and in the book Recordações de Guerra e de Viagem by famous Brazilian writer Alfredo d'Escragnolle Taunay, who took part in the battle.

In Paraguay, Children's Day is celebrated on August 16. It is a national holiday to commemorate the memory of the children who lost their lives in the battle.

References

Conflicts in 1869
Acosta Nu
Acosta Nu
Acosta Nu
Acosta Nu
August 1869 events
1869 in Paraguay
Massacres in Paraguay
19th-century murders in Paraguay
History of Cordillera Department